A fallstreak hole (also known as a cavum, hole punch cloud, punch hole cloud, skypunch, cloud canal or cloud hole) is a large gap, usually circular or elliptical, that can appear in cirrocumulus or altocumulus clouds. The holes are caused by supercooled water in the clouds suddenly evaporating or freezing, and may be triggered by passing aircraft.

Because of their rarity and unusual appearance, fallstreak holes have been mistaken for or attributed to unidentified flying objects.

Origin 
Such holes are formed when the water temperature in the clouds is below freezing, but the water, in a supercooled state, has not frozen yet due to the lack of ice nucleation. When ice crystals do form, a domino effect is set off due to the Wegener-Bergeron-Findeisen process, causing the water droplets around the crystals to evaporate: this leaves a large, often circular, hole in the cloud. It is thought that the introduction of large numbers of tiny ice crystals into the cloud layer sets off this domino effect of fusion which creates the hole.

The ice crystals can be formed by passing aircraft, which often have a large reduction in pressure behind the wing-tip or propeller-tips. This cools the air very quickly, and can produce a ribbon of ice crystals trailing in the aircraft's wake. These ice crystals find themselves surrounded by droplets, and grow quickly by the Bergeron process, causing the droplets to evaporate and creating a hole with brush-like streaks of ice crystals below it. An early satellite documentation of elongated fallstreak holes over the Florida Panhandle that likely were induced by passing aircraft appeared in Corfidi and Brandli (1986). Fallstreak holes are more routinely seen by the higher resolution satellites of today (e.g., see fourth example image in this article).

The articles by Westbrook and Davies (2010) and Heymsfield et al. (2010) explain the processes behind the formation of fallstreak holes in greater detail, and show some observations of their microphysics and dynamics. Such clouds are not unique to any one geographic area and have been photographed from many places.

Examples

See also
 List of cloud types
 Circumhorizontal arc
 Cloud iridescence
 Distrails
 Virga

References

External links

Clouds
Articles containing video clips
Unidentified flying objects